The majority of qualification places for rowing at the 2012 Summer Olympics were awarded based on results at the 2011 World Championships, held at Lake Bled, Bled, Slovenia, in August and September 2011.  Those places were awarded to National Olympic Committees, not the specific athletes. Further berths were allocated at three continental qualifying regattas in Africa, Asia and Latin America (heavyweight single and lightweight double sculls only) and a final Olympic qualification regatta in Lucerne, Switzerland.

Qualification timeline

Summary

Single sculls men

Pairs men

Double sculls men

Fours men

Quadruple sculls men

Eights men

Double sculls lightweight men

Fours lightweight men

Single sculls women

Pairs women

Double sculls women

Quadruple sculls women

Eights women

Double sculls lightweight women

 The Tripartite Commission can issue invitations covering up to 4 rowers.

References

Qualification
Qualification for the 2012 Summer Olympics